State Correctional Institution – Muncy is a Pennsylvania Department of Corrections prison for women in Clinton Township, Lycoming County, near Muncy. SCI Muncy, a close security prison, has Pennsylvania's death row for women.

In 1920 the Muncy Industrial Home, a training school for imprisoned women between 16 and 30, opened. In 1953 the industrial home became a part of the Bureau of Correction. The industrial home is now SCI Muncy.

SCI-Muncy is the diagnostic center for female offenders in the Pennsylvania Department of Corrections. It also houses the Young Adult Offenders program. SCI-Muncy has received some press coverage for its service dog training program which is coordinated with Canine Partners for Life.

As of 2014 the prison had 1,400 prisoners, including 170 with life sentences and it houses the female offenders on Death Row.

Operations
John Beauge of Pennlive.com stated that the prison "still resembles an early 1900s small college campus, albeit one with a few plain, modern buildings added over the years."

The restricted housing unit houses some women with disciplinary issues, and one wing serves as the death row unit.

Notable inmates
 Mary Jane Fonder- Convicted in the murder of Rhonda Smith.
 Sylvia Seegrist- Convicted in the October 30th, 1985 shooting at Springfield Mall in Springfield, Pennysylvania that left three people dead.
 Tabitha Buck- Convicted in the Murder of Laurie Show.
 Sharon Wiggins- Convicted of bank robbery and murder.
 Peggy Darlene Miller- Convicted in the Murder of Jennifer Daugherty.
 Amber Meidinger- Convicted in the Murder of Jennifer Daugherty.

References

External links

 "SCI Muncy." Pennsylvania Department of Corrections
Eaton, Alissa. "Veterinarians help preserve service dog training program at state correctional facility." Sun Gazette. December 2, 2008.

Muncy
Muncy
Buildings and structures in Lycoming County, Pennsylvania
Capital punishment in Pennsylvania
Government buildings completed in 1953
1953 establishments in Pennsylvania